Dolakha Town is a village of Bhimeshwar Municipality of the Dolakha District, located in Bagmati Province in the lower Himalayas region of northern Nepal.

Etymology
In its origin the town of Dolakha was called "Abhayapur" which means "Abhay" — without fear; and "pur" — cities. That is why Dolakha Town is also referred to as the "city without fear" because of the power of the god Bhim Sen.

See also

External links
  Dolakhatown.blogspot
 Dolakhatown.googlepages
 Dolakhaphoto.blogspot

Populated places in Dolakha District
Municipalities in Bagmati Province
Towns in Nepal